Lasha Giunashvili (born 29 July 1992) is a Georgian judoka.

He is the gold medallist of the 2017 Judo Grand Prix Tbilisi in the -66 kg category.

References

External links
 

1992 births
Living people
Male judoka from Georgia (country)